Azorella selago is a species of cushion plant native to the sub-Antarctic islands of the Southern Ocean, including the Crozet Islands, the Possession Islands, the Heard Island and McDonald Islands, the Kerguelen Islands, and the Prince Edward Islands. The closely related Azorella macquariensis, which is endemic to Macquarie Island, was split from it taxonomically in 1989. A. selago is often a keystone species where it occurs and is well studied for its contribution to its native ecosystems.

References

selago
Flora of Heard Island and McDonald Islands
Flora of the Kerguelen Islands
Flora of the Prince Edward Islands
Taxa named by Joseph Dalton Hooker
Plants described in 1845